James William McClennon (16 December 1900 – 1971) was an English professional footballer who played in the Football League for Brentford and Grimsby Town as a full back.

Career statistics

References

1900 births
Sportspeople from Tynemouth
Footballers from Tyne and Wear
English footballers
English Football League players
Association football fullbacks
Brentford F.C. players
Walker Celtic F.C. players
Grimsby Town F.C. players
1971 deaths
West Stanley F.C. players